Ramin Mehrabani Azar (born 18 February 1986) is an Iranian former professional cyclist, who rode professionally between 2009 and 2015.

Mehrabani tested positive for metenolone at the 2011 International Presidency Tour and received a 2 year suspension until 29 June 2013.

Major results

2008
 5th Overall Milad De Nour Tour
 8th Overall Taftan Tour
2009
 1st Stage 6 Tour of Iran (Azerbaijan)
 2nd Road race, National Road Championships
 3rd Overall Milad De Nour Tour
2010
 1st Overall Milad De Nour Tour
1st Stage 2
 3rd Overall International Presidency Tour
 9th Overall Tour de Singkarak
 9th Overall Tour of Iran (Azerbaijan)
2011
 3rd Melaka Governor's Cup
2013
 5th Overall Tour of Fuzhou
 6th Overall Tour of China I
 6th Overall Tour de Ijen
2014
 3rd Overall Tour de Singkarak
1st Mountains classification
1st Stage 3
 3rd Overall Tour of Iran (Azerbaijan)
 10th Overall Tour de East Java
2015
 3rd Overall Tour of Iran (Azerbaijan)
 6th Overall Tour de Singkarak

References

External links

1986 births
Living people
Iranian male cyclists
21st-century Iranian people